Cornell College is a private college in Mount Vernon, Iowa. Originally the Iowa Conference Seminary, the school was founded in 1853 by George Bryant Bowman. Four years later, in 1857, the name was changed to Cornell College, in honor of iron tycoon William Wesley Cornell.

Academics
Cornell students study one course at a time (commonly referred to as "the block plan" or "OCAAT"). Since 1978, school years have been divided into "blocks" of three-and-a-half weeks each (usually followed by a four-day "block break" to round out to four weeks), during which students are enrolled in a single class; what would normally be covered in a full semester's worth of class at a typical university is covered in just eighteen Cornell class days.  While schedules vary from class to class, most courses consist of around 30 hours of lecture, along with additional time spent in the laboratory, studying audio-visual media, or other activities. Colorado College in Colorado Springs, Colorado; Maharishi University of Management in Fairfield, Iowa; Quest University in Squamish, British Columbia; Tusculum College in Tusculum, Tennessee; and The University of Montana - Western are the only other colleges operating under a similar academic calendar. Cornell formerly operated on a calendar of 9 blocks per year but switched to 8 blocks per year beginning in the fall of 2012.

From its inception, Cornell has accepted women into all degree programs. In 1858, Cornell was host to Iowa's first female recipient of a baccalaureate degree, Mary Fellows, a member of the first graduating class from Cornell College. She received a bachelor's degree in mathematics. In 1871, Harriette J. Cooke became the first female college professor in the United States to become a full professor with a salary equal to that of her male colleagues.

Campus buildings

The most widely recognizable building on Cornell's campus is King Chapel.  The chapel is the site of the annual convocation at the commencement of the school year as well as the baccalaureate service in the spring for graduating students.  The chapel contains a large organ (over 3000 pipes) and is often the site of musical performances. Religious services are held in the nearby Allee Chapel.

Old Sem, for a short while, was the second building of the original college and now houses administrative offices of the college.

Cornell contains 9 academic buildings.  College Hall (also sometimes called "Old Main"), the oldest building on campus, houses classrooms and offices of several social science and humanities departments.  South Hall, originally a male dormitory, houses the Politics and Creative Writing Departments.  Prall House contains offices and classrooms of the Philosophy and Religion Departments.  The Merle West Science Center houses the Physics, Biology, and Chemistry Departments.  West Science contains one of the school's two stadium seating lecture-style classrooms, with a capacity around 100. These have since been relocated to the new science building, Russell Science Center. It opened for classes for the 2019–2020 academic year.  The Norton Geology Center contains both an extensive museum and classrooms for geological sciences.  Law Hall includes the Math, Computer Science, and Psychology Departments, and is the computing hub of the campus.  McWethy Hall, formerly a gymnasium, was remodeled and now contains the studios and offices of the Art Department.  Armstrong Hall and Youngker Hall are adjoining fine arts buildings.  Armstrong Hall is the location of the Music Department, while Youngker Hall contains the Theatre Department, including Kimmel Theatre.  In addition, the Small Sports Center and the Lytle House contain classrooms of the Kinesiology Department.

Cole Library serves both the college and the Mount Vernon community.

Cornell has several residence halls. Pfeiffer Hall, Tarr Hall, and Dows Hall together form the "Tri-Hall" area. Tarr was once an all-male residence hall, but now houses both males and females. Likewise, Dows, once an all-female residence hall, joins Pfeiffer and Tarr in providing co-ed housing. Tarr and Dows are both primarily freshmen dorms, while Pfeiffer houses upperclassmen as well as first-years. Pfeiffer was extensively renovated in 2008 and is co-ed by room. Bowman-Carter Hall is an all-female hall for upperclassmen, situated in an old hospital building. Pauley-Rorem Hall (commonly referred to as PR) is a combination of two residence halls that are joined in the middle by a common set of stairs. Female first-years resided in Pauley, and male first-years resided in Rorem until 2012-2013 when both residence halls became co-ed by floor. Pauley Hall was once home to the Pauley Academic Program, a community of male and female students with strong academic backgrounds. Pauley Hall was co-ed by floor as early as 1986, and in 1987–1989, the second floor Pauley was home to the Academic Program and was co-ed by room. Olin and Merner Hall are co-ed upper-class residence halls. New and Russell Hall (the latter commonly known as Clock Tower) were opened in 2005 and 2007, respectively, and offer suite-style living. Students may choose more independent living options in apartments at Wilch Apartments, 10th Avenue, Armstrong House, and Harlan House, and even at the Sleep Inn. Nearly all Cornell students are required to live on-campus or in campus apartments, so most students do not rent non-college housing.

The Cornell campus is centered on a modest hill, the feature noted in the moniker "Hilltop Campus." Several campus buildings are grouped on the hilltop, while the athletic facilities and some residential buildings are located farther downhill on the campus's northwest side.

Athletics
Cornell College fields 19 intercollegiate athletic teams, all of which compete in NCAA Division III sports. Formerly a member of the Iowa Intercollegiate Athletic Conference (IIAC), Cornell joined the Midwest Conference (MWC) in the fall of 2012.

Cornell has achieved its greatest success in wrestling. Cornell wrestlers have won eight individual national titles, and in 1947, the wrestling team won the NCAA Division I and AAU national championships. Sixty-Two Cornell wrestlers have been named NCAA All-Americans, and seven have been elected to the National Wrestling Hall of Fame.  Seven wrestlers have also competed at the Olympics.

Another Cornell team has also met with success recently. In 2011, the women's volleyball team captured the IIAC title and went on to take part in the national tournament for the first time in school history. Since then, the women's volleyball team has moved to the Midwest Conference (MWC) and won the MWC title seven times consecutively—six of those seven years making it to the national tournament.

Twenty-five Cornell students have earned NCAA Postgraduate Scholarships, awarded annually to students in their final year of eligibility who excel both athletically and academically. Cornell ranks in the top 15 Division III colleges in recipients of this award.

Cornell's football rivalry with Coe College dates to 1891, making it the oldest intercollegiate rivalry west of the Mississippi. Coe currently holds the lead in the series, 60-51-4.

Cornell's mascot is a ram.  In 1949, the Royal Purple, the school's yearbook, offered a $5 prize for someone who could come up with a new mascot to replace either the "Purples" or "Hilltoppers."  A sophomore came up with the idea for the ram.

Greek life

Cornell College has 12 officially recognized local fraternities and sororities.

Phi Kappa Nu "Newts"
Phi Lambda Xi "Phi-Lambs"                                           
Alpha Chi Epsilon "AXEs"
Alpha Sigma Pi "Arrows"
Mu Lambda Sigma "Milts"
Phi Omega "Phi-Os"
Gamma Tau Pi "Gammas"
Kappa Theta "Thetas"
Zeta Tau Psi "Zetas"
Beta Psi Eta "Betas"
Delta Phi Delta "Delphis"
Beta Omicron "Owls"

Notable alumni
Frank Jeremiah Armstrong (1900) - First African American graduate of the college
Rob Ash (1973) — Head football coach at Montana State University
Leo Beranek (1936) — Co-founder of Bolt, Beranek and Newman
Chris Carney (1981) — Congressman from Pennsylvania's 10th Congressional district
Robert Cousins (1881) — U.S. Congressman from Iowa (1893–1909)
Emma Amelia Cranmer (late 19th century) — temperance reformer, woman suffragist, writer
James Daly (1941) — Emmy Award-winning actor
Lester J. Dickinson (1898) — U.S. Congressman (1919–1931) and Senator from Iowa (1931–1937)
Lee Alvin DuBridge (1922) — President of the California Institute of Technology, science advisor to U.S. President Richard Nixon
Don E. Fehrenbacher (1948) — Pulitzer Prize for History winner
Michael J. Graham (1975) — President of Xavier University
Orin D. Haugen (1925) - Colonel in the United States Army during World War II 
David Hilmers (1972) — NASA astronaut and medical doctor
Duane Garrison Hunt (1907) - Roman Catholic Bishop of Salt Lake City from 1937 until his death in 1960 
Rupert Kinnard (1979) — Cartoonist, known for creating the first ongoing gay/lesbian African-American comic characters
Franklin Littell (1937) — Holocaust scholar
Maryann Mahaffey (1946) — Detroit City Council member
Erwin Kempton Mapes (1909) — renowned scholar of Spanish-American Literature
William Wallace McCredie (1885) — Judge, U.S. Congressman from Washington (1909–1911) and Baseball Executive
Deb Mell (1990) —  member of Illinois House of Representatives
Jack Norris (1989) - President and co-founder of Vegan Outreach
Grimes Poznikov (1969) - street performer in San Francisco, California
Harper Reed (2001) — CTO of Obama for America 2012 campaign
Leslie M. Shaw (1874) — Governor of Iowa, U.S. Secretary of Treasury
Burton E. Sweet (1895) — U.S. Congressman from Iowa (1915–1923) and unsuccessful Senate Candidate (1922, 1924)
Dale O. Thomas (1948) — Wrestler and coach
Walter Thornton (1899) — Major League Baseball player
John Q. Tufts (late 19th century) — Congressman from Iowa's 2nd Congressional district (1875–1877)
Hubert Stanley Wall (1924) — mathematician
Thomas Zinkula (1979) — Roman Catholic Bishop of Diocese of Davenport

Notable faculty
Joseph M. Bachelor — author
Glenn Cunningham — Silver Medalist 1500 meters run, 1936 Olympics
Robert Dana — Poet Laureate of Iowa
Charles Wesley Flint, President (1915–1922), Methodist bishop 
Bruce Frohnen — academic
Leroy Lamis — American sculptor
Jim Leach — former Republican congressman, taught as a visiting professor.
David Loebsack — Congressman from Iowa's 2nd District
Ann R. Cannon  — fellow of the American Statistical Association, Assistant Chief Reader for the AP Statistics exam.

Notable staff
Lisa Stone — Head Coach, Saint Louis University Women's Basketball

Notes
 As of June 30, 2013. Page 44.

References

External links
 
 Official athletics website

 
Mount Vernon, Iowa
Educational institutions established in 1853
Education in Linn County, Iowa
Buildings and structures in Linn County, Iowa
Tourist attractions in Linn County, Iowa
1853 establishments in Iowa
Private universities and colleges in Iowa